Yogev (Hebrew: יוֹגֵב) is both a given name and a surname meaning "husbandman, husbander; farmer". 

Notable people with the name include:

 Yogev Ben Simon (born 1986), Israeli footballer
 Yogev Hazuharoui (born 1991, born Yogev Hazuharoui Lerman), Israeli footballer
 Yogev Ohayon (born 1987), Israeli basketball player
 Moti Yogev (born 1956, born Mordechai Vagenburg), Israeli politician
 Ori Yogev (born 1960), Israeli businessman

Hebrew-language given names
Hebrew-language surnames
Jewish surnames
Jewish given names